Dreamland is the second studio album by the American brother/sister duo Wild Belle. It was released on April 15, 2016, by Columbia Records. The album is set of moody, groove-oriented songs with a deeper emotional impact and more influenced in their laid-back tropical vibe, supposedly due to the lead singer Natalie Bergman ending a toxic relationship during the record process.

Reception

The album received 4 out of 5 stars by Renowned for Sound. Atwood Magazine rated the album 7.1 on a 10-point scale. Matt Collar of AllMusic gave the album a rating of 3.5 out of 5 stars. Now rated the album 3 out of 5 stars.

Track listing

References

2016 albums
Wild Belle albums